Entobia is a trace fossil in a hard substrate (typically a shell, rock or hardground made of calcium carbonate) formed by sponges as a branching network of galleries, often with regular enlargements termed chambers. Apertural canals connect the outer surface of the substrate to the chambers and galleries so the sponge can channel water through its tissues for filter feeding (Bromley, 1970). The fossil ranges from the Devonian to the Recent (Taylor and Wilson, 2003; Tapanila, 2006).

References

External links
 Image of Entobia cretacea as a cast showing canals and chambers in three dimensions

Boring fossils